Samuel John Paparo Jr. (born 1964) is a United States Navy four-star admiral serving as the 64th commander of the United States Pacific Fleet, succeeding Admiral John C. Aquilino on May 5, 2021. He previously served as commander of the United States Naval Forces Central Command, United States Fifth Fleet and Combined Maritime Forces. In previous command tours, Paparo commanded Carrier Strike Group 10 from July 2017 to March 2018 and Carrier Air Wing 7 from August 2011 to December 2012.

A native of Morton, Pennsylvania, Paparo is the son of a former enlisted Marine and the grandson of a World War II enlisted sailor. As a youth, Paparo attended Cardinal O'Hara High School. He was commissioned in 1987 via the NROTC program at Villanova University. He earned an M.A. degree in International Studies from Old Dominion University and an M.S. degree in Systems Analysis from the Naval Postgraduate School. He also graduated from the Air Command and Staff College, the Air War College, the Naval War College and the Joint and Combined Warfighting School.

Awards and decorations

References

1964 births
Living people
Place of birth missing (living people)
Villanova University alumni
United States Naval Aviators
United States Navy personnel of the Iraq War
United States Navy personnel of the War in Afghanistan (2001–2021)
Old Dominion University alumni
Naval Postgraduate School alumni
Recipients of the Legion of Merit
United States Navy admirals
Recipients of the Defense Superior Service Medal